The Halford Mackinder Professor of Geography established in 1971 is located at St Peter's College of the University of Oxford. The post is named after Sir Halford Mackinder, the first Reader in the Department of Geography in Oxford, and an important figure in the early years of Geography as an academic subject in the United Kingdom.

 Professor John House (1974–1984)
 Abeyance (1984–1986)
 Professor David Harvey (1987–1995)
 Professor Gordon L. Clark (1995–2013)
 Professor Danny Dorling (2013–present)

References

Geography, Halford Mackinder
Geography, Halford Mackinder
St Peter's College, Oxford
Lists of people associated with the University of Oxford